City rights are a feature of the medieval history of the Low Countries. A liege lord, usually a count, duke or similar member of the high nobility, granted to a town or village he owned certain town privileges that places without city rights did not have.

In Belgium, Luxembourg, and the Netherlands, a town, often proudly, calls itself a city if it obtained a complete package of city rights at some point in its history. Its current population is not relevant, so there are some very small cities. The smallest is Staverden in the Netherlands, with 40 inhabitants. In Belgium, Durbuy is the smallest city, whilst the smallest in Luxembourg is Vianden.

Overview

When forced by financial problems, feudal landlords offered for sale privileges to settlements from around 1000. The total package of these comprises town privileges.

Such sales raised (non-recurrent) revenue for the feudal lords, in exchange for the loss of power. Over time, the landlords sold more and more privileges. This resulted in a shift of power within the counties and duchies in the Low Countries from the aristocracy to the bourgeoisie, starting in Flanders. Some of these cities even developed into city-states. The growing economic and military power concentrating in the cities led to a very powerful class of well-to-do merchants and traders.

Common City rights 
Privileges
Defensive walls (the right to erect a defence wall around an inhabited area)
Market right (the right to hold markets and receive income from them)
Staple right (the right to store and exclusively trade particular goods, often only granted to a few cities)
Toll right (the right to charge tolls)
Mint right (the right to mint city coinage)
Taxation (the right to levy taxes)
Weighing (the right to organize official weighing: cargo, livestock, produce, building material, trading goods etc.)  
Freedoms
Personal freedom (citizens had a relative degree of personal freedom in comparison to citizens of rural areas: they were not subject to the liege lord and had freedom of mobility) – Hence the old saying "Stadslucht maakt vrij" ('City air makes free').
Governance
Self-governance (Well-to-do citizens could sometimes elect local government officials)
Judiciary and law-making (Within its boundaries the city could have a great degree of autonomy)

Rights granted to the cities of present-day Belgium

Grants of city rights, alphabetically.

Rights granted to the cities of present-day Luxembourg

Modern era
Note several of the following were first granted city rights during the medieval period.

Rights granted to the cities of the present-day Netherlands
The first community in the contemporary Kingdom of the Netherlands to receive city rights was Deventer in 956. It can be argued that some cities have older rights: for instance Nijmegen may have been granted city status during the Roman Empire. Another case is Voorburg, which is built on the site of the Roman settlement Forum Hadriani and was granted city status in about AD 151, but was abandoned in the late 3rd century: thus the current settlement is not considered an uninterrupted continuation of the Roman city. At the end of the Middle Ages, the number of grants of city status fell dramatically.

The strong position of merchants and traders allowed the Netherlands to become the first modern republic in the 16th century.

End of city rights
The institution of city status gradually came to an end with the development and centralization of a national government. In the Netherlands the last city to receive real city rights (as defined above) was Willemstad in 1586. During the Dutch Republic, only Blokzijl gained city rights (in 1672). After the Batavian Revolution in 1795, municipalities were styled after the French model and city rights were abolished by law. Although partially restored after 1813, cities did not fully regain the authority they had previously had: law-making and the judiciary had become part of the state. After the Constitution of 1848 and the Municipal Law of 1851, the differences between the legal privileges of cities, towns, and villages were permanently erased.

In the early 19th century, when several important towns (especially The Hague) wanted to call themselves cities, the custom of granting city status was briefly revived. The last grant of city status in the Netherlands was to Delfshaven in 1825. But the city status granted during this period was quite different from the privileges bestowed in the Middle Ages, and were merely symbolic. This is also the case for cities such as The Hague and Assen, which received their status during the Napoleonic period.

Grants of city rights, chronologically

See also
 Town privileges
 History of urban centers in the Dutch Low Countries
 City status in the United Kingdom
 Scottish Burgh

References

Bibliography

External links
City Rights in the Netherlands (in Dutch)
Repertorium van de stadsrechten in  Nederland (in Dutch)

History of the Low Countries
Medieval Netherlands
Urban planning by region